Catherine Grace Garner (born September 17, 1996), known professionally as Slayyyter, is an American pop singer and songwriter from Kirkwood, Missouri, currently based in Los Angeles. She started her career independently through SoundCloud. Her single "Mine" reached number 38 on the iTunes pop chart. The song was included on her self-titled debut mixtape which was released in 2019. Her debut studio album, Troubled Paradise, was released in June 2021 under Fader.

Early life and career

Early life
Slayyyter is from Kirkwood, Missouri, a suburb of St. Louis, where she has "kind of lived [her] whole life". She went to private grade schools, and later continued her education in public school, where she was "offered great music classes for the first time."

2017–2018: Early approaches to music and first single releases
Slayyyter spent a year in college, studying at the University of Missouri. This time was an "expensive experiment" in which she started her career as a musician, writing "'80s lo-fi pop" that she herself produced and edited, but never published. She later dropped out and committed fully to her music career. Her most frequent collaborator, Ayesha Erotica, is from Southern California. The artists met through Twitter, which is where Slayyyter first developed a following. The artist credits Stan Twitter for introducing her to Ayesha.

Apart from Slayyyter's debut single "BFF", the singles "Ghost", "Candy", "Alone", "Hello Kitty" (produced by Boy Sim but written/sold by Ayesha), and "All I Want for XXXmas" also sprung from the collaboration between the two artists. Slayyyter's 2018 single releases included "I'm High" (produced by GhostHaus) and "Platform Shoes" (produced by Boy Sim). 

In 2018, she and Ayesha Erotica were doxxed by a SoundCloud artist named void4ngel.

2019–2020: Singles, The Mini Tour, and Slayyyter 
After a 14-second snippet of the song gathered attention on Twitter with over 200,000 views, "Mine" was released on Valentine's Day and in less than 24 hours reached number 38 on the iTunes pop chart in the United States.

In June 2019, Slayyyter embarked on her sold-out debut tour, entitled "The Mini Tour". The tour began on June 24 in New York City, and concluded on July 27 in her hometown of St. Louis.

On September 17, 2019, Slayyyter released her self-titled mixtape, Slayyyter, on iTunes. The mixtape peaked at #4 on the US iTunes Pop Chart, and #14 on the US iTunes Albums Chart. She released a remix of Britney Spears' "Gimme More" to her SoundCloud in April 2020. In October and November, she released the singles "Self Destruct" and "Throatzillaaa", respectively.

2021: Troubled Paradise & Troubled Paradise Tour 

Slayyyter's debut studio album, Troubled Paradise, was released on June 11, 2021 through Fader Label. The title track and its music video were released on January 22. On January 26, Heidi Montag confirmed via Twitter that she would be collaborating with Slayyyter. On February 26, she released the song "Clouds".

On April 9, she released another single called "Cowboys". "Over This!" followed on May 7.

On June 11, 2021 her debut album Troubled Paradise was released. Pitchfork's Ashley Bardhan called the project "vibrant and ridiculous". Slayyyter promoted the album by releasing VEVO Live performances for the tracks 'Letters' and 'Troubled Paradise'. 

On November 5, 2021, she released the standalone single “Stupid Boy”, a pop-dance song featuring Big Freedia. Later that year, she released Inferno Euphoria, an EP of remixes from the Troubled Paradise Album. She has also released multiple features for other artists’ catalogues.

2022-present: Forthcoming album and tour 
Slayyyter's "Daddy AF", from her self-titled mixtape, appeared as the opening track in 2022's black comedy horror film Bodies Bodies Bodies.

In early June 2022, Slayyyter played a song on tour titled “Hollywood”. She played 2 and a half minutes of the song. 

On July 24, 2022, Slayyyter tweeted, “album almost done with a lipstick emoji”. On July 29, 2022, she tweeted “one sec im finishing it all!! with a clock & hand hearts emoji“ after replying to a fan asking for a status on the new music.      

On October 3, 2022, Swedish singer Tove Lo confirmed via Instagram that Slayyyter will be the opening act on the North American leg of her Dirt Femme Tour.

Artistry

Music style
Her music style has been likened to Britney Spears, Lindsay Lohan, and Paris Hilton, as well as sounding somewhat "like Charli XCX on whippets". Slayyyter cites Spears, Fergie, Timbaland, Nelly Furtado, Lady Gaga, Taylor Swift, Justin Timberlake, Madonna, Heidi Montag, Janet Jackson, and Whitney Houston as some of the artists she listened to the most growing up and who ultimately influenced her musical style. Slayyyter's visual style has been defined as "distinct MySpace-era". She frequently collaborates with British-based artist Glitchmood for single artworks.

Personal life
Slayyyter has publicly stated that she is bisexual.

Name 
Slayyyter previously tried to keep her real name private, going by the pseudonym Catherine Slater, which has been referenced in media as her real name, in an attempt to keep fans and press away from her family.

Controversy 
In 2019, it was revealed that Slayyyter made a series of tweets in 2012 and 2013 containing racial slurs. She later apologized for the tweets, saying that "I have grown and changed so much in the past eight years and the person I am today is not who I was at age 15. Eight years is a lot of time to reflect, grow, mature and better yourself as a human being. And I know that being young or uneducated about the matter also does not excuse any of these things, but please know that people do change." As a result, Slayyyter committed funds resulting from her CD and vinyl sales to the Sylvia Rivera Law Project and Black Trans Travel Fund - two charities benefitting black trans youth.

Discography

Studio albums

Mixtapes

Extended plays

Singles

As lead artist

As featured artist

SoundCloud releases

Tours

Headlining 

 The Mini Tour (2019)
 Club Paradise Tour (2022)

Supporting 

 Charli Live Tour (2019)
 Dirt Femme Tour (2023)

References

1996 births
Living people
21st-century American women singers
American women pop singers
American women in electronic music
Bisexual singers
Bisexual songwriters
Bisexual women
LGBT people from Missouri
American LGBT singers
American LGBT songwriters
People from Kirkwood, Missouri
Hyperpop musicians